Coursetia gracilis is a species of legume in the family Fabaceae. It is found only in Ecuador. Its natural habitat is subtropical or tropical dry shrubland.

References

Sources

Robinieae
Flora of Ecuador
Vulnerable plants
Taxonomy articles created by Polbot
Plants described in 1988